St. Mary's Roman Catholic Church Complex may refer to:

St. Mary's Catholic Church (Davenport, Iowa), listed on the U.S. National Register of Historic Places (NRHP) as St. Mary's Roman Catholic Church Complex
St. Mary's Roman Catholic Church Complex (Waltham, Massachusetts), also NRHP-listed

See also
St. Mary's Roman Catholic Church (disambiguation)